Mitchell David Kapor (born November 1, 1950) is an American entrepreneur best known for his work as an application developer in the early days of the personal computer software industry, later founding Lotus, where he was instrumental in developing the Lotus 1-2-3 spreadsheet. He left Lotus in 1986. In 1990 with John Perry Barlow and John Gilmore, he co-founded the Electronic Frontier Foundation, and served as its chairman until 1994. In 2003, Kapor became the founding chair of the Mozilla Foundation, creator of the open source web browser Firefox. Kapor has been an investor in the personal computing industry, and supporter of social causes via Kapor Capital and the Kapor Center. Kapor serves on the board of SMASH, a non-profit founded by his wife, Freada Kapor Klein, to help underrepresented scholars hone their STEM knowledge while building the networks and skills for careers in tech and the sciences.

Early life and education
Kapor was born to a Jewish family in Brooklyn, New York, and raised in Freeport, New York on Long Island, where he graduated from high school in 1967.  He received a B.A. from Yale College in 1971 and studied psychology, linguistics, and computer science in an interdisciplinary major, also attending the Boston-based Beacon College, which had a satellite campus in Washington, D.C. at the time. He began but did not complete a master's degree at the MIT Sloan School of Management but later served on the faculty of the MIT Media Lab and the University of California, Berkeley School of Information.

Career

Lotus
Kapor and his business partner Jonathan Sachs founded Lotus in 1982 with backing from Ben Rosen. Lotus' first product was presentation software for the Apple II known as Lotus Executive Briefing System. Kapor founded Lotus after leaving his post as head of development at VisiCorp, the distributors of the Visicalc spreadsheet, and selling all his rights to VisiPlot and VisiTrend to VisiCorp.

Shortly after Kapor left Visi-Corp, he and Sachs produced an integrated spreadsheet and graphics program. Even though IBM and VisiCorp had a collaboration agreement whereby Visi-Calc was being shipped simultaneously with the PC, Lotus had a clearly superior product. Lotus released Lotus 1-2-3 on January 26, 1983. The name referred to the three ways the product could be used, as a spreadsheet, graphics package, and database manager. In practice the latter two functions were less often used, but 1-2-3 was the most powerful spreadsheet program available.

Lotus was almost immediately successful, becoming the world's third largest microcomputer software company in 1983 with $53 million in sales in its first year, compared to its business plan forecast of $1 million in sales. Jerome Want says:
Under founder and CEO Mitch Kapor, Lotus was a company with few rules and fewer internal bureaucratic barriers.... Kapor decided that he was no longer suited to running a company, and [in 1986] he replaced himself with Jim Manzi.

Digital rights activism
Kapor was extensively involved in initiatives that created the modern Internet. He co-founded the Electronic Frontier Foundation in 1990 and served as its chairman until 1994. EFF defends civil liberties in the digital world and works to ensure that rights and freedoms are enhanced and protected as the use of technology grows.

Kapor attended the first Wikimania in 2005.

Investments
Kapor was the founding investor in UUNET, one of the first, and the largest among, early Internet service providers; of Real Networks, the Internet's first streaming media company; and of Linden Lab, maker of the first successful virtual world, Second Life. He was also founding chair of the Commercial Internet eXchange (CIX).

In 2003, Kapor became the founding chair of the Mozilla Foundation, creator of the open source web browser Firefox.

Kapor serves on the advisory board of the Sunlight Foundation. In May 2009, after founder Susan P. Crawford had joined the Obama administration, Kapor took over chairmanship of OneWebDay - the "Earth Day for the internet". In 1996, the Computer History Museum named him a Museum Fellow "for his development of Lotus 1-2-3, the first major software application for the IBM PC". He founded the Mitchell Kapor Foundation to support his philanthropic interests in environmental health.

As an active angel investor, Kapor participated in the initial rounds of Dropcam, Twilio, Asana, Cleanify, and Uber.

Kapor Center and Kapor Capital
Kapor founded the Kapor Center in 2000 as an institution focused on tech inclusion and social impact. The institution's mission is to invest in social and financial capital in vital non-profit organizations.

As part of the Kapor Center, Kapor Capital is its venture capital arm. The venture capital firm has been investing since 2011. As of 2018, Kapor Capital has made over 160 investments, primarily in information technology seed stage startups, with a particular focus on diversity.

Since 2016, the Kapor Center for Social Impact, Kapor Capital, and SMASH have been located in the Uptown neighborhood of Oakland, CA.

Diversity in technology
In August 2015, Mitch and Freada announced they would invest $40 million over three years to accelerate their work to make the tech ecosystem more inclusive.

In addition to his roles at Kapor Capital and Kapor Center, Mitch currently serves on the board of SMASH, whose mission is to enhance equal opportunity in education and the workplace, and sits on the advisory board of Generation Investment Management, a firm whose vision is to embed sustainability into the mainstream capital markets.

Personal life
He is married to Freada Kapor Klein and resides in Oakland and Healdsburg, California. Both served on the board of trustees of the Summer Science Program from 2004 to 2006. He was a student of the program in 1966.

Awards and honors
1985 – Golden Plate Award of the American Academy of Achievement
2003 – Computer Professionals for Social Responsibility Norbert Wiener Award
2005 – EFF Pioneer Award
2010 – REDF Inno+prise Award
2015 – Ford Legacy Award
2018 – Elon University Medal for Entrepreneurial Leadership

See also
 Massively distributed collaboration
 List of Jewish American activists

References

Further reading
Rosenberg, Scott. Dreaming in Code: Two Dozen Programmers, Three Years, 4,732 Bugs, and One Quest for Transcendent Software (2007) Random House , about Mitch Kapor, collaboration and massive software endeavors, particularly the open source calendar application Chandler.

Articles
 "Civil Liberties in Cyberspace" - Scientific American Special Issue on Communications, Computers, and Networks, September, 1991 
 Articles in the EFF archive

External links

 Mitch Kapor's weblog archives
 "Inside Mitch Kapor's World" 
 Mitch Kapor's "Why Wikipedia Is the Next Big Thing"
 Wikimania 2006 bio
 "How to Build a Successful Company", Kapor speaking at Stanford (podcast & video)
 Kapor Center For Social Impact
 Kapor Capital
 
 
 

1950 births
Living people
People from Brooklyn
People from Freeport, New York
Businesspeople from San Francisco
People from Healdsburg, California
Massachusetts Institute of Technology alumni
Yale College alumni
MIT Sloan School of Management alumni
American computer businesspeople
20th-century American Jews
Second Life
Internet activists
Electronic Frontier Foundation people
Wikimedia Foundation Advisory Board members
Mozilla people
Summer Science Program
American bloggers
American technology company founders
American chairpersons of corporations
Open source advocates
21st-century American Jews